This is a list of notable grape dishes and foods that are prepared using grapes as a primary ingredient. Raisin dishes and foods are also included in this article.

Grape dishes and foods 

A grape is a fruit, botanically a  berry, of the deciduous woody vines of the flowering plant genus Vitis.
 Churchkhela – grape must is a main ingredient
 Grape ice cream – ice cream with a grape flavor, some recipes use grape juice in its preparation.
 Grape leaves – the leaves of the grapevine plant, which are used in the cuisines of a number of cultures
 Grape pie – a pie with grape filling.
 Grape seed oil – oil pressed from the seeds of grapes.
 Grape syrup – a thick and sweet condiment made with concentrated grape juice
 Jallab –  a type of fruit syrup popular in the Middle East made from carob, dates, grape molasses and rose water
 Pekmez – a molasses-like syrup obtained after condensing juices of fruit must, especially grape
 Moustalevria – a traditional Greek kind of pudding made of grape must mixed with flour and boiled until thick.
 Torta Bertolina – a typical autumnal dessert from the northern Italian town of Crema presented in a round shape, but it is often available cut into slices. It has a golden brown hue and the fragrance of the small American or Concord grapes, which are one of its main ingredients. 
 Vincotto – a dark, sweet, thick paste made by the slow cooking of grapes

Beverages
 Grape juice – obtained from crushing and blending grapes into a liquid
 Grape soda

Raisin dishes and foods 

A raisin is a dried grape. Raisins are produced in many regions of the world and may be eaten raw or used in cooking, baking, and brewing.
 Chocolate-covered raisin
 Oatmeal raisin cookie
 Raisin bread – A type of bread made with raisins and flavored with cinnamon.
 Raisin cake
 Sultana (grape)
 White raisins
 Zante currant

See also
 List of fruit dishes

References

External links 
 

 
Lists of foods by ingredient
Raisins